Tay Khang, or just Kang, is a Tai language of Laos. There is confusion with Kháng. Schliesinger (2003) reports an area of habitation being in Bolikhamsai Province, Laos.

Religion of speakers is Theravada Buddhism and animism. 

An audio recording in this language by Michel Ferlus is available online from the Pangloss Collection.

References

External links
 

Southwestern Tai languages
Languages of Laos